Scaevola chanii is a species of plant in the family Goodeniaceae. It is endemic to Borneo where it is confined to Sabah.

References

chanii
Endemic flora of Borneo
Flora of Sabah
Vulnerable plants
Taxonomy articles created by Polbot